Wonder Cement is an Indian cement producing company that is based out of Rajasthan. It was started in 2010 under RK Group. It manufactures Portland pozzolana and ordinary Portland cement for plaster, brickwork, and other construction applications.

Plants 
In 2012, the company set up its first unit in Nimbahera, Rajasthan, with thirty lakh tonnes per annum.
In 2015, Wonder Cement added another unit taking its annual cement production to 67.5 lakh tonnes.
In 2018, the company invested ₹450 crore to set up a 20 lakh (2 million) tonne per annum clinker grinding unit in Dhule, Maharashtra. In 2019, Wonder Cement invested ₹1,100 crore to build a third plant at Nimbahera in Rajasthan's Chittorgarh district, increasing its annual capacity of producing close to  1.1 crore (11 million) tonnes of cement. In 2020, Wonder Cement invested ₹800 crore to set up cement plants in Badnawar and Jhajjar which increased the annual capacity to  1.3 crore (13 million) tonnes of cement.

Awards and recognition 
Wonder Cement was recognised as Asia's Most Promising Brand 2018, in the cement category by  360 WCRCINT research.

References

External links

Cement companies of India
Companies based in Rajasthan
Organisations based in Udaipur
Manufacturing companies established in 2010
Indian companies established in 2010